Emmi Nikkilä (born 20 October 1999) is a Finnish aesthetic group gymnast. She is a six-time (2015 - 2020) Finnish National champion in Aesthetic group gymnastics competing with Team Minetit. She is a three-time (2015, 2017, 2021) AGG World champion and the 2016 AGG European champion.

References 

1999 births
Living people
Finnish gymnasts
Gymnasts from Tampere